Mattie Moss Clark (born Mattie Juliet Moss; March 26, 1925 – September 22, 1994) was an American gospel choir director and the mother of The Clark Sisters, a gospel vocal group. She was the longest-serving International Minister of Music for the Church of God in Christ (COGIC). "Her arrangements, perhaps influenced by her classical training, replaced the unison or two-part textures of earlier gospel music with three-part settings of the music for soprano, alto, and tenor voice ranges—a technique that remained common in gospel choir music for decades afterward."

Early life
Mattie Juliet Moss was born the seventh of nine children to ministers Fred John Moss and Mattie Juliet Walker in Selma, Alabama She began playing piano at six. By twelve, she had become the musician for her mother's services at the Holiness Temple Church of Christ in Prayer and traveled with her mother to play at mission services, a trend she passed on to daughter Twinkie.

After high school, she attended Selma University and received training in classical music and choral singing. She moved to Detroit in 1947 to be with her sister Sybil Burke and became a member of Greater Love Tabernacle Church of God in Christ. There, under the leadership of Bishop W. Rimson, she was baptized in the Holy Ghost and subsequently became the Minister of Music. She served a historic tenure as Minister of Music for both Southwest Michigan Jurisdiction and Bailey Cathedral Church of God in Christ, under Bishop John Seth Bailey. Soon she was in demand to train choirs at churches throughout the brotherhood of COGIC.

Career
In 1958, she recorded "Going to Heaven to Meet the King", with the Southwest Michigan State Choir, becoming one of the first to teach and conduct a mass choir composed of members of different churches. She received three gold albums with the Southwest Michigan State Choir, and went on to write and arrange hundreds of songs and recorded over 50 albums. She directed Cadillac Motor Company's Christmas choir for 11 years and also conducted community-wide mass choirs for the prestigious NAACP Freedom Fund Dinners.

In early-1968, Clark and Elma Hendricks convened a Sing-A-Rama in Detroit at Reverend C. L. Franklin‘s New Bethel Baptist Church (Detroit, Michigan). They formed a 1,000 voice choir and had legendary gospel singer, Reverend James Cleveland come in as a special guest.  Cleveland so enjoyed the music and teaching classes that he told Clark he would like to create a similar convocation and maybe call it the Music Workshop of America.  Clark suggested that he add “Gospel” to the title to let prospective attendees know it was gospel music only.  Cleveland wasted no time in putting the word out.  The first Gospel Music Workshop of America (GMWA) convention took place in August 1968 at the King Solomon Baptist Church in Detroit.  The idea was to perpetuate the legacy and appreciation of gospel music through classes and provide an opportunity to expose new talent.

In 1979, she founded the Clark Conservatory of Music in Detroit, which established itself as one of the most prestigious schools of its kind in the country. In 1981, Trinity College in Pennsylvania conferred upon her one of their highest honors, the degree of Doctor of Humanities. After the death of Bishop Bailey in 1985, she continued as State Minister of Music for Southwest Michigan Jurisdiction #1, attending Greater Mitchell Church of God in Christ, under Bishop J.H. Sheard.

Personal life
Clark married twice. By her first husband, whom she married on December 30, 1945, Leo Henry Cullum Sr., Clark mothered two children, Leo Henry Cullum, Jr. and Jacqueline Lenita "Jacky". After their divorce, she married Elder Elbert Clark (1927-2001) on November 30, 1952 and had four children, Denise Darchell, Elbernita, Dorinda Grace, and Karen Valencia. The Clarks divorced in 1973. Dr. Clark mentored her daughters, having them sing as part of her and their father's church's choir, Berea Church of God In Christ.

In 1973, shortly after divorcing Elbert Clark, Clark sparked the forming of The Clark Sisters. After nearly ten years, Clark passed all responsibility of the group to daughter Twinkie, who became the leader of the group.

Later years
In the late 80s and early 90s, Clark's health began to decline due to diabetes. According to Dorinda Clark-Cole, she had her right leg amputated and suffered a stroke which left her confined to a wheelchair. Despite failing health, Clark continued to record music into the last year of her life before succumbing to complications from diabetes on September 22, 1994 at Providence Hospital in Southfield, Michigan, at age 69.

She was interred at Roseland Park Cemetery  in Oakland County, Michigan.

In addition to The Clark Sisters, Mattie Moss Clark's gospel singing legacy continues through her grandchildren Kierra Sheard, J. Drew Sheard, Angel Chisholm, Lorenzo, Larry and Derrick (of the Clark Brothers), and her nephews Bill Moss Jr., and J. Moss (part of the production team PAJAM).

Actress Aunjanue Ellis played Clark in the 2020 Lifetime biopic The Clark Sisters: First Ladies of Gospel to critical acclaim from fans, critics, and the Clark Sisters themselves.

Discography

Studio albums

Albums Directed and Presented

Other Appearances

References

External links
The Clark Sisters Official Website

Partial Savoy Catalog Listing

 Mattie Miss Clark at FindAGrave

1925 births
1994 deaths
Deaths from diabetes
American gospel singers
Singers from Detroit
Musicians from Selma, Alabama
American Pentecostals
Members of the Church of God in Christ
African-American Christians
20th-century American singers
Pentecostals from Michigan